Surte is a locality situated in Ale Municipality, Västra Götaland County, Sweden. It had 5,798 inhabitants in 2010. Surte Church is located in the town.

It is located some 15 kilometers north of Gothenburg. Surte became well-known for its glass works that started production in 1862 and became one of the major mechanized glass works in Sweden.

In Surte, there was a large landslide in 1950, which killed one person and destroyed 30 houses.  More houses had to be removed, causing 450 people to lose their home.  It also blocked the river which had frequent ship traffic.

Surte was the hometown of Alexander Samuelson. Although he was not the designer, he was the man named on the 1915 design patent for the legendary contour Coca-Cola bottle.

The international Grand Master of chess Gideon Ståhlberg, one of the world's strongest players in the 1940s, was born and is buried in Surte.

Surte is home to the bandy club Surte BK. They built one of the first indoor bandy arenas in Sweden (and subsequently in the world), which was the first in Götaland.

The village Bohus, located 2½ km (1½ mile) north of Surte centre, has grown together with Surte and, in official statistics, is handled as one village.

References 

Populated places in Västra Götaland County
Populated places in Ale Municipality